The Ministry of Public Finance of Guatemala is the government ministry of Guatemala in charge of governing the fiscal policy and public finances.

History 
The ministry was established by a decree in April 1839. In April 1945, it was renamed as Ministry of Finance and Public Credit. It was redesignated as Ministry of Public Finance in December 1971, according to decree of the Congress of the Republic of Guatemala.

Ministers
José Nájera y Batres, ?-1851-1858-?
Miguel Cerezo, ?-1872-?
Angel Peña, ?-1880-1881-?
Ramón A. Salazar, 1882-1883-?
Delfino Sánchez, ?-1884-?
Salvador Escobar, ?-1886-?
Manuel Cárdenas, ?-1887-?
Mauricio Rodríguez, ?-1888-?
Rafael Salazar, ?-1889-1890-?
Juan Orantes M., ?-1890-1891-?
F. García, ?-1891-?
Salvador Herrera, ?-1892-1894-?
J. M. González, ?-1895-1897-?
Rafael Salazar, ?-1898-?
Francisco C. Castañeda, ?-1898-?
Francisco Villacorta, ?-1899-?
Pedro Gálvez Portocarrero, ?-1900-?
Guillermo Aguirre, ?-1900-1917-?
Adrián Vidaurre, ?-1920-?
Mariano Zeceña, 1920–1921
José A. Medrano, 1921
Rafael Felipe Solares, 1921-1923-?
Salvador Herrera, ?-1924
Rafael Felipe Solares, 1924–1926
Carlos O. Zachrisson, 1926
Baudilio Palma, 1926–1927
Rafael Felipe Solares, 1927–1928
Samuel E. Franco, ?-1929-1930-?
José González Campo, ?-1931-?
José González Campo, ?-1935-1937-?
Willis Dearborn Howe, 1938–?
Francisco Cordón Horjales, ?-1939
Willis Dearborn Howe, 1940
Juan Antonio Martínez Perales, 1940
José González Campo, ?-1944-?
Gabriel Orellana H., ?-1945
Jorge Toriello Garrido, 1945
Carlos Leonidas Acevedo, 1945–1948
Arturo Herbruger, 1948
Óscar Barrios Castillo, 1948–1949
Alfonso Padilla Iriarte, 1949
Óscar Barrios Castillo, 1949–1950
Augusto Charnaud MacDonald, 1950
Gregorio Prem Beteta, 1952
Raúl Sierra Franco, 1953
Raúl Reyna Rosal, 1954
Jorge Echeverría Lizarralde, 1954–1957
Héctor Menéndez de la Riva, 1957–1958
Carlos Salazar Gatica, 1958–1959
Julio Prado García Salas, 1959–1960
Manuel Bendfeldt Jáuregui, 1960–1962
Raúl Reyna Rosal, 1962–1963
Jorge Caballeros Mazariego, 1963–1965
Gabriel Orellana Estrada, 1965–1966
Alberto Fuentes Mohr, 1966–1968
Mario Fuentes Pieruccini, 1968–1969
Emilio Peralta Portillo, 1969–1970
Jorge Lamport Rodil, 1970–1977
Arturo Aroch Navorro, 1977–1978
Hugo Tulio Búcaro, 1978–1980
Arnoldo Beltetón San José, 1980–1982
Leonardo Figueroa Villate, 1982–1985
Ariel Rivera Irías, 1985–1986
Rodolfo Ernesto Paiz Andrade, 1986–1989
Juan Francisco Pinto Casasola, 1989–1990
Marciano Castillo González, 1990–1991
Irma Raquel Zelaya, 1991
Richard Aitkenhead Castillo, 1991–1994
Ana Ordóñez de Molina, 1994–1996
José Alejandro Arévalo Alburez, 1996–1997
Pedro Lamport-Kelsall, 1997–1999
Irma Luz Toledo Peñate, 1999–2000
Manuel Maza Castellanos, 2000–2001
Eduardo H. Weymann Fuentes, 2001–2003
María Antonieta Bonilla, 2004–2006
Hugo E. Beteta Méndez-Ruiz, 2006–2007
Mefi Eliud Rodríguez García, 2007–2008
Juan Alberto Fuentes, 2008–2010
Édgar Balsells Conde, 2010
Rolando del Cid Pinillos, 2010–2012
Pavel Centeno López, 2012–2013
María Concepción Castro Mazariegos, 2013–2014
Dorval Carías, 2014–2016
Julio Héctor Estrada, 2016–2018
Víctor Martínez Ruiz, 2018–2020
Alvaro González Ricci, 2020– 

Sources:

See also
 Bank of Guatemala

References

External links 
 Ministry of Public Finance

Ministries of Guatemala
Government of Guatemala
Guatemala
1839 establishments in Guatemala